
Lago Ritom is a lake in the Piora valley, Ticino, Switzerland. The natural lake is used as a reservoir by the Swiss Federal Railways (SBB-CFF-FFS) to generate hydro-electric power for the Gotthard line. The first dam was built in 1918 and, in 1950, its height was increased by 23 m.

Overview
The lake's surface area is 1.49 km² at an elevation of 1850 m. With Lake Cadagno and Lago di Tom, it is one of the main lakes in the Piora valley.

Before being used as a reservoir, Lake Ritom was a meromictic lake similar to the nearby Lake Cadagno.

Transport

The lake can be reached by funicular from Piotta 786 m below. The track with a length of 1,369 m has a maximum inclination of 87.8%, the highest in Europe after the Gelmerbahn funicular (106%).

See also
List of lakes of Switzerland
List of mountain lakes of Switzerland

References

External links

Lago Ritom - tourist information
Ritom funicular 
Ritom's waters power the Gotthard

Lakes of Ticino
Reservoirs in Switzerland